The Believer is a solo album by American country/rock musician Rhett Miller, lead singer of the Old 97's.

Track listing
All songs written by Rhett Miller unless otherwise noted.
"My Valentine"
"Help Me, Suzanne"
"Meteor Shower" (Miller, Jerry Marotta)
"Brand New Way"
"Ain't That Strange"
"I Believe She's Lying" (Jon Brion, Aimee Mann)
"Fireflies"
"Singular Girl" (Miller, Ken Bethea, Murry Hammond, Philip Peeples) (newly recorded from Satellite Rides bonus CD)
"I'm With Her" (Miller, Andrew Williams)
"Delicate"
"The Believer" (for Elliott Smith)
"Question" (Miller, Ken Bethea, Murry Hammond, Philip Peeples, Simon Ford) (newly recorded from Satellite Rides)

References

Rhett Miller albums
2006 albums
Albums produced by George Drakoulias